The Elizabeth C. Quinlan House is a historic residence located in the Lowry Hill neighborhood of Minneapolis, Minnesota. Designed in an eclectic take on the Renaissance Revival style, it was built in 1925 by Frederick L. Ackerman for Elizabeth Quinlan. Quinlan had helped found one of the first women's clothing shops in Minneapolis in 1894 and had gone on to enjoy great success in the apparel business.

Built at a cost of $47,000, the L-shaped three story home features details such as stucco walls with quoining, terra cotta roofing and decorative ironwork (including work from Samuel Yellin). The home features architectural similarities to Quinlan's store, the Young–Quinlan Building, which was also designed by Ackerman in a similar style and completed one year later in 1926.

Quinlan lived in the home from 1925 until her death in 1947. The home was then passed on to her relatives and remains privately owned today. It was added to the National Register of Historic Places in 2012 as an excellent example of the 1920s eclectic architectural style and of Frederick Ackerman's work.

References

Eclectic architecture
Houses completed in 1925
Houses in Minneapolis
Houses on the National Register of Historic Places in Minnesota
National Register of Historic Places in Minneapolis
Renaissance Revival architecture in Minnesota
1925 establishments in Minnesota